Naporitan or Napolitan is a popular Japanese itameshi pasta dish. The dish consists of soft-cooked spaghetti, tomato ketchup, onion, button mushrooms, green peppers, sausage, bacon and optionally Tabasco sauce. Naporitan is claimed to be from Yokohama.

Origin 
It was created by Shigetada Irie, the chef of the Hotel New Grand in Yokohama.

Name 
The chef named the dish after Naples, Italy (hence "Napoli"). Phonetically, the Japanese language doesn't distinguish R and L as separate sounds, and so uses the same katakana characters to represent R and L sounds of Western alphabets. Thus when converting katakana back into English, based solely on the Japanese writing the spelling in the English alphabet is ambiguous and can vary. The spelling Naporitan is derived from the usual romanization of Japanese, while the spelling Napolitan takes the origin of the name into account. This could be roughly translated as Neapolitan.

See also

 Yōshoku
 Itameshi
 List of pasta dishes
 Neapolitan ragù
 Filipino spaghetti, a similar pasta dish from Philippines

References 

 " Naporitan, I'm crazy for Naporitan spaghetti!", Fuso "smick" sha – November 2004,  (Japanese)

Pasta dishes
Japanese fusion cuisine
Italian fusion cuisine